Portobelo (Modern Spanish: "Puerto Bello" ("beautiful port"), historically in Portuguese: Porto Belo) is a historic port and corregimiento in Portobelo District, Colón Province, Panama, Central America, with a population of 4,559 . It functions as the seat of Portobelo District. Established in 1597 during the time of the Spanish empire due to its deep natural harbor, it served as one of the two ports (together with Veracruz  to the northwest) through which Spanish treasure was shipped from the mines of Peru (via Panama City on the Pacific side of the Isthmus and overland to Portobelo) back to Spain. The city was repeatedly captured by British privateers and pirates, culminating in a successful siege by the Royal Navy in 1739, during the War of Jenkin's Ear.

Its economy received a major boost in the late-19th century during the construction of the Panama Canal. In 1980, UNESCO designated the ruins of the Spanish colonial fortifications, along with nearby Fort San Lorenzo, as a World Heritage Site named "Fortifications on the Caribbean Side of Panama: Portobelo-San Lorenzo".

History

Portobelo was founded in 1597 by Spanish explorer Francisco Velarde y Mercado and quickly replaced Nombre de Dios as a Caribbean port for Peruvian silver.  Legend has it that Christopher Columbus originally named the port "Puerto Bello", meaning "Beautiful Port", in 1502.  After Francis Drake died of dysentery in 1596 at sea, he was buried at sea in a lead coffin near Portobelo Bay, memorialised by the present Isla Drake ("Drake Island") at the mouth of the harbour. During the 16th to the 18th centuries it was an important silver-exporting port in New Granada on the Spanish Main and one of the two Atlantic ports on the route of the Spanish treasure fleets. The Spanish built defensive fortifications.

In 1601 the English privateer William Parker captured Portobello from the Spanish. Welshman Henry Morgan repeated the feat in 1668, having led a fleet of privateers and 450 men and overcome its strong fortifications. His forces plundered it for 14 days before withdrawing. It was captured again in 1680 by pirate John Coxon.

In 1726 the British suffered a disaster in their Blockade of Porto Bello under Admiral Francis Hosier, an attempt to prevent the Spanish treasure fleet returning to Spain, when due to their lengthy wait and inactivity (as ordered by the British government) moored at Bastimentos  to the northeast (not to be confused with another Bastimentos Island 270 miles to the west), the large part of the sailors died from tropical diseases. The disaster was vindicated 13 years later when during the War of Jenkins' Ear the port was attacked and captured on November 21, 1739, by a British fleet of six ships commanded by Admiral Edward Vernon. The victory created an outburst of popular acclaim throughout the British Empire. More medals were struck for Vernon than for any other 18th-century British figure and across the British Isles the name of "Portobello" was given to places and streets in honor of the victory, most notably Portobello Road in London, the district of Portobello in Edinburgh and the Portobello Barracks in Dublin.

However the Spanish soon recovered Portobelo when in 1741 they defeated Admiral Vernon in the Battle of Cartagena de Indias and forced him to return to England with a decimated fleet, having suffered more than 18,000 casualties, mostly due to disease. British efforts to gain a foothold on the Spanish Main and disrupt the galleon trade were ultimately fruitless. Following the War of Jenkins' Ear, the Spanish switched from using large fleets calling at few ports to small fleets trading at a wide variety of ports, developing a flexibility that made them less subject to attack. Ships also began to travel around Cape Horn to trade directly at ports on the western coast.

Today

The population of Portobelo in 1990 was 3,058 and in 2000 was 3,867. In July 2012 the UNESCO World Heritage Committee placed Portobelo and nearby Fort San Lorenzo on the List of World Heritage in Danger, inscribed as Fortifications on the Caribbean Side of Panama: Portobelo-San Lorenzo, citing environmental factors, lack of maintenance, and uncontrolled urban developments.

See also
Iglesia de San Felipe
Portobello, Edinburgh
Portobello, Dublin
Portobello Road, London

References

Bibliography
 Rodger, N. A. M. The Command of the Ocean: A Naval History of Britain, 1649-1815.

External links

2009 Festival de Diablos y Congos (in Spanish), Portobelo
Devils' Dance celebration in Portobelo, Santiago and La Villa de Los Santos (in Spanish)
Fortifications on the Caribbean Side of Panama: Portobelo-San Lorenzo on UNESCO World Heritage List
Portobelo-San Lorenzo on Global Heritage Network

Populated places in Colón Province
World Heritage Sites in Panama
Populated places established in 1597
World Heritage Sites in Danger
Corregimientos of Colón Province
1597 establishments in the Spanish Empire